Heena Hoyana Samanallu (Dreaming Butterflies) is a 2017 Sri Lankan Sinhala family drama film directed by Rohan Perera and produced by Sunil T Fernando for Sunil T Films. It stars Dilhani Ekanayake and Saumya Liyanage in lead roles along with many child actors. Music composed by Navaratna Gamage. The film was released on 11 August 2017, where the premier show was celebrated at Savoy Premier Cinema Hall, Wellawatte. It is the 1284th Sri Lankan film in the Sinhala cinema.

Plot

Cast
 Dilhani Ekanayake as Madhavi Wijebandara
 Saumya Liyanage as Aditya Wijebandara
 Nethalie Nanayakkara as Tharaka's grandmother
 Hemasiri Liyanage as Tharaka's grandfather
 Lucien Bulathsinhala as Specialist doctor
 Jayani Senanayake as Village teacher 
 Umali Thilakarathne as Village teacher
 Jayantha Muthuthanthri
 Aruni Mendis as Nurse

Child cast
 Vinath Thesath as Shehan Wijebandara
 Anjana Dilsara as Tharaka
 Supun Kawishka
 Lakshitha Aravinda
 Yohan Harshana
 Tharupathi Nadun

Songs

References

External links
 හීන හොයන සමනල්ලු මගේ අන්තිම බලාපොරොත්තුවයි
 හීන හොයන්න ගිය සමනල්ලු එන්න ළඟයි
 ළමයි කොහොමටත් දඟයි ඒක තේරුණාම ප්‍රශ්න නැහැ
 “මාතෘ සෙනෙහසක උත්කෘෂ්ටය පිළිගැන්වීමකි”
 නපුරුකමට ගමද නගරයද අදාළ නැහැ
 Heena Hoyana Samanallu Watch Full Movie

2017 films
2010s Sinhala-language films
Sri Lankan drama films
2017 drama films